"Tourniquet" is song by American rock band Marilyn Manson. It was released as the second major-label single from their second studio album Antichrist Superstar. The image this song conveys is that of the main character in a world of sorrow and self-pity, prior to his transformation into the Little Horn. It was written by frontman Marilyn Manson, co-founder Daisy Berkowitz and longtime bassist and guitarist Twiggy Ramirez. Like many other songs from Antichrist Superstar, the song's lyrics are based on a dream Manson had.

The song was used as the theme music for professional wrestler Jeff Hardy during his stint with Ring Of Honor. The song is also featured as downloadable content for Guitar Hero: Warriors of Rock as part of the "February Mega Pack." The song also can be learned on guitar with Rocksmith 2014 Remastered. The song was part of the Marilyn Manson song pack that became available on July 25, 2017.

Background
Manson told Rolling Stone: "I've always had these dreams about making a girl out of all these pieces of prosthetic limbs, and then taking my own hair and teeth that I saved from when I was a kid and very ritualistically creating this companion." Those dreams were the inspiration for "Tourniquet".

Composition
"Tourniquet" is a gothic rock song with a length of four minutes and thirty seconds. It begins with the backwards message "This is my lowest point of vulnerability". Like many Marilyn Manson songs from the first three albums, some of the lyrics to this song were previously a poem Manson had written prior to the formation of the band. Lorraine Ali of Rolling Stone wrote that while the influence of Alice Cooper is present throughout Antichrist Superstar, it is "full-blown" on "Tourniquet".

Critical reception
For MetalSucks, Axl Rosenberg called "Tourniquet" and "Lunchbox" some of "Manson's best early material". AllMusic's Stephen Thomas Erlewine said that "Not every [Marilyn Manson] single had a great hook -- 'Tourniquet' is a moody dirge, indicative of what awaits a listener on the album tracks". Matt Zakosek of The Chicago Maroon called the track "weary Goth-rock junk" and criticized its inclusion on the greatest hits album Lest We Forget: The Best Of (2004).

Music video
The video for "Tourniquet" was directed by Floria Sigismondi, who also directed the video for "The Beautiful People". Sigismondi says that directing the video got her to gain confidence in herself and her "offbeat ideas". In order to gain inspiration for the video, she went through a period of sleep deprivation, and was elated to see her ideas for the video "manifest into physical form." Sigismondi discussed the video's impact with Claire Lobenfeld of Fact, saying "It was shocking to see that so many people responded to that [video's] imagery like they did. I'm sure there was a lot of different things at work there – the song, the lyrics, [Manson's] image – coupled with the video, but I do believe that in a way we all have the same rooted fears and dreams – part of that 'collective unconscious'."

Track listing
Australian Release
"Tourniquet" - 4:29
"The Tourniquet Prosthetic Dance Mix" - 7:24
"The Horrible People" - 5:12

UK (CD I) / European Release
"Tourniquet" - 4:29
"The Tourniquet Prosthetic Dance Mix" (edit) - 4:10
"The Tourniquet Prosthetic Dance Mix" - 7:24

UK (CD II) Release
"Tourniquet" - 4:29
"Lunchbox" - 4:34
"Next Motherfucker" (Lunchbox) - 4:48

Promo
U.S. Release
"Tourniquet" - 4:29

UK 7"
A-Side: "Tourniquet" - 4:29
B-Side: "The Perfect Drug" - 5:15

UK 12"
A & B Side
"The Tourniquet Prosthetic Dance Mix" - 7:24
"The Tourniquet Prosthetic Dance Mix" (Edit) - 4:10

Personnel

Musicians
 Marilyn Manson – vocals, lyrics
 Daisy Berkowitz – guitar, music
 Twiggy Ramirez – bass guitar, music
 Madonna Wayne Gacy – keyboards
 Ginger Fish – drums

Production
 Trent Reznor – producer
 Dave "Rave" Ogilvie – producer
 Marilyn Manson – co-producer
 Sean Beavan – mixing
 Chris Vrenna – editing and programming

Charts

References

External links
 

1997 singles
Marilyn Manson (band) songs
Music videos directed by Floria Sigismondi
Song recordings produced by Trent Reznor
1996 songs
Songs written by Marilyn Manson
Songs written by Jeordie White
Interscope Records singles
Gothic rock songs
Songs based on poems